New Stone Hall is a historic school building located at Franklin in Delaware County, New York, United States. It was built in 1855–1856 and is a three-story rectangular building, eight bays wide and three bays deep.  It features a slate-covered hipped roof and octagonal cupola.  It was built as the main academic building of the Delaware Literary Institute, then later used by the local school system.  It was abandoned in 1932. It is located within the Franklin Village Historic District.

It was listed on the National Register of Historic Places in 1980.

See also
National Register of Historic Places listings in Delaware County, New York

References

National Register of Historic Places in Delaware County, New York
School buildings completed in 1856
Buildings and structures in Delaware County, New York
Historic district contributing properties in New York (state)
Stone school buildings
Stone buildings in the United States